is a 2008 Japanese animated adventure film produced by OLM, Inc. and distributed by Toho. The film was directed by Kunihiko Yuyama from a screenplay by Hideki Sonoda. It is the 11th animated film in the Pokémon film series created by Satoshi Tajiri, Junichi Masuda and Ken Sugimori, and serves as a direct sequel to Pokémon: The Rise of Darkrai (2007).

In the film, a researcher called Zero seeks to sacrifice and absorb the interdimensional abilities of a Pokémon known as Giratina, which has surfaced in Zero's world following the events of the previous film, so that Zero can become the ruler of Giratina's world. Meanwhile, the Pokémon trainers Ash Ketchum, Dawn, and Brock escort a flower-bearing Pokémon called Shaymin, which is being followed by Giratina, to reunite it with other Shaymin at a flower garden.

It was released in Japan on July 19, 2008. A sequel, Pokémon: Arceus and the Jewel of Life, was released in 2009. The theme song for the film is "One" by Crystal Kay.

Plot 
Five years ago, Newton Graceland, a researcher of a world exactly opposite to the world of reality called the Reverse World, built a device to absorb the abilities of the Pokémon Giratina, the ruler of the Reverse World, to travel freely between the two worlds. He canceled the project upon learning that the process would kill Giratina. The blueprints were deleted but Newton's assistant Zero never forgot them.

Later, time and space, two dimensions that should never have been in contact, collided and unraveled. Dialga, the Pokémon which rules over time, and Palkia, which controls space, then fought each other in Alamos Town, both believing the other to have violated their territory. The distortions in time and space have defiled the Reverse World with pollution, angering Giratina.

Giratina captures Dialga and drags it into the Reverse World. Shaymin, a hedgehog-like Pokémon which bears flowers, gets caught on Dialga’s back when the portal opens. A frightened Shaymin uses its powers to escape through a portal back to the world of reality. Dialga follows Shaymin after it disables Giratina's ability to venture to the world of reality by trapping it in an infinite time loop.

Shaymin runs into the Pokémon trainers Ash Ketchum, Dawn, and Brock, who agree to take Shaymin to the Flower Garden in the mountains, so it and others of its kind can migrate and grow a new garden, through a process called flower bearing. A portal to the Reverse World opens and swallows Shaymin, Ash, and Dawn.

In the Reverse World, Ash and Dawn encounter Giratina but are rescued by Newton. Giratina, who wants to use Shaymin's power to come into the world of reality, targets Shaymin, prompting Newton to send Shaymin, Ash, and Dawn back to the world of reality. Zero, who is also seeking Shaymin's power, attacks the kids with his army of Magnemite, Magneton and Magnezone, forcing them to escape onto a departing train. On the train, Shaymin makes contact with a Gracidea flower and transforms into its Sky Forme, altering its appearance to a deer-like state and allowing it to fly. Ash, Dawn, and Brock board a ferry to the Flower Garden, but are sucked into the Reverse World again, followed by Zero and his Pokémon. Giratina attacks the group after Shaymin provokes it. When night falls, Shaymin transforms back to its normal form. Zero captures Shaymin, forcing it to open a portal for Giratina to return to the world of reality, freeing it from the time loop. Shaymin panics, opening a portal which sends Ash and his friends to the Flower Garden in the world of reality.

Giratina returns to the world of reality and is captured by Zero. Zero uses Newton's device to absorb Giratina's abilities with the intention of becoming ruler of the Reverse World. Newton shuts down the device, releasing Giratina. However, Zero has already absorbed all of Giratina's abilities and Giratina collapses from exhaustion. Shaymin heals Giratina. Zero flees to the Reverse World to cause damage to the world of reality, causing the mountain's glacier to start moving towards the Flower Garden. The Pokémon Regigigas is awakened and along with a herd of Mamoswine, slows the glacier down.

In the Reverse World, Shaymin opens a portal, dragging Zero back to the world of reality. Zero's ship crashes into the glacier. Dawn's Buneary and Swinub freeze the ship, causing the Zero to lose all of the data about Giratina's abilities. Giratina restores the damage caused by Zero, and gives Ash a ride back to the world of reality. It then leaves on its own to track down Dialga. Shaymin and the others of its kind perform flower bearing, before migrating. During the end credits, Newton rescues and reconciles with Zero who is then arrested, whilst Ash, Dawn and Brock send bouquets of flowers to their respective families as an expression of gratitude.

Cast

Main cast

Release

Theatrical run 
The film was released in Japan on July 19, 2008 by Toho.

Broadcast airing 
Pokémon: Giratina & the Sky Warrior was aired in United States on February 13, 2009 on Cartoon Network.

Home media 
This was the first Pokémon film to be distributed by Universal Studios Home Entertainment in North America. It was also the first anime film that Universal has ever distributed in the country. The home media rights holders for the Pokémon anime, Viz Media would later re-release the film on July 7, 2015, with Warner Bros. Home Entertainment acting as the distributor. Universal Studios Home Entertainment also released the film in several European countries, including the United Kingdom. Then it was later re-released by Manga Entertainment in the UK on May 21, 2018, as part of the Diamond and Pearl 4 film collection. It was later re-released again separately by Manga UK on April 15, 2019.

Reception

Box office 
It took the second Japanese box office, beaten by Ponyo on the Cliff by the Sea during the July 19–20 weekend, when Giratina to Sora no Hanataba: Shaymin saw 982,000 viewers spending ¥1,018,770,000 ($9,463,400) to see the film. It eventually raked in just 10% less than the previous year's film, Pokémon: The Rise of Darkrai.

Critical reception 
Pokémon: Giratina & the Sky Warrior got generally positive reviews. Kidzworld gave it a positive review saying that "In summary, it's a fine movie, and definitely worth watching, whether you’re a fan of Pokemon or not".

Notes

References

External links 

  
 
 

2008 anime films
2000s Japanese-language films
Films about artificial intelligence
Films about angels
Giratina and the Sky Warrior
2008 films
Toho animated films
Japanese sequel films
Universal Pictures animated films
Universal Pictures films
Viz Media anime
Films directed by Kunihiko Yuyama
Films scored by Shinji Miyazaki
OLM, Inc. animated films